Crossodactylus grandis is a species of frog in the family Hylodidae.
It is endemic to Brazil.
Its natural habitats are subtropical or tropical high-altitude grassland and rivers.
It is threatened by habitat loss.

References

Crossodactylus
Endemic fauna of Brazil
Amphibians of Brazil
Taxa named by Bertha Lutz
Taxonomy articles created by Polbot
Amphibians described in 1951